Ariadne (minor planet designation: 43 Ariadne) is a fairly large and bright main-belt asteroid. It is the second-largest member of the Flora asteroid family. It was discovered by N. R. Pogson on 15 April 1857 and named after the Greek heroine Ariadne.

Characteristics
Ariadne is very elongate (almost twice as long as its smallest dimension) and probably bi-lobed or at least very angular. It is a retrograde rotator, although its pole points almost parallel to the ecliptic towards ecliptic coordinates (β, λ) = (−15°, 253°) with a 10° uncertainty. This gives an axial tilt of about 105°.

Studies
43 Ariadne was in a study of asteroids using the Hubble FGS. Asteroids studied include (63) Ausonia,  (15) Eunomia, (43) Ariadne, (44) Nysa, and (624) Hektor.

Trivia
 For reasons unknown, "Asteroid 43 Ariadne" was included in a list of names of supporters of the NASA spacecraft Stardust that was stored on a microchip within the spacecraft.
 The maximum apparent size of Ariadne is equivalent to the maximum apparent size of Pluto.

References

External links 
 shape model deduced from lightcurve
 bi-lobed shape model from Hubble lightcurves 
 
 

Flora asteroids
Ariadne
Ariadne
S-type asteroids (Tholen)
Sk-type asteroids (SMASS)
18570415
Ariadne